The 2022 Thoreau Tennis Open was a professional tennis tournament played on outdoor hard courts. It was the third edition of the tournament which was part of the 2022 WTA 125 tournaments. It took place at The Thoreau Club in Concord, Massachusetts between 8 and 14 August 2022.

Singles main-draw entrants

Seeds

 1 Rankings are as of 1 August 2022.

Other entrants
The following players received wildcards into the singles main draw:
  Ashlyn Krueger
  Lulu Sun
  Clara Tauson
  Taylor Townsend
  Coco Vandeweghe

The following player received entry into the singles main draw through protected ranking:
  Varvara Flink

The following players received entry from the qualifying draw:
  Kayla Day
  Eva Lys
  Katrina Scott
  Kateryna Volodko

The following player received entry as a lucky loser:
  Moyuka Uchijima

Withdrawals 
Before the tournament
  Vitalia Diatchenko → replaced by  Caty McNally
  Ekaterine Gorgodze → replaced by  Varvara Flink
  Anna Kalinskaya → replaced by  Renata Zarazúa
  Tamara Korpatsch → replaced by  Mariam Bolkvadze
  Ann Li → replaced by  Astra Sharma
  Daria Snigur → replaced by  Wang Qiang
  Wang Xiyu → replaced by  Moyuka Uchijima

Retirement
  Karolína Muchová (wrist injury)

Doubles main-draw entrants

Seeds 

† Rankings are as of 1 August 2022

Withdrawals 
Before the tournament
  Sophie Chang /  Angela Kulikov → replaced by  Lidziya Marozava /  Kateryna Volodko
  Anna Kalinskaya /  Caty McNally → replaced by  Alycia Parks /  Renata Zarazúa
  Peangtarn Plipuech /  Jessy Rompies → replaced by  Peangtarn Plipuech /  Moyuka Uchijima

Champions

Singles

  CoCo Vandeweghe def.  Bernarda Pera 6–3, 5–7, 6–4

Doubles

  Varvara Flink /  CoCo Vandeweghe def.  Peangtarn Plipuech /  Moyuka Uchijima 6–3, 7–6(7–3)

References

External links
 Thoreau Tennis Open 125 at wtatennis.com
 Official website

2022 in American tennis
Tennis in Massachusetts
2022 in sports in Massachusetts
August 2022 sports events in the United States